The 2015 WAC men's basketball tournament was a postseason men's basketball tournament for the Western Athletic Conference, held from March 12–14, 2015 at the Orleans Arena in Paradise, Nevada.

Format
Grand Canyon did not compete in the 2015 men's basketball tournament for the second time. As a D2 to D1 transitioning school, they are ineligible to compete in the NCAA tournament or the NIT (which is also operated by the NCAA) until the 2018 season, so they could not win the conference tournament as the winner received an automatic bid to the NCAA Tournament. However Grand Canyon was eligible to win the regular season title and was eligible to compete in the CIT or the CBI. (The Antelopes did in fact receive a bid to, and participated in, the 2015 CIT.)

Seeds

Overall record at the end of regular season

Schedule

Bracket

See also
2014-15 NCAA Division I men's basketball season
WAC men's basketball tournament

References

Tournament
WAC men's basketball tournament
WAC men's basketball tournament
WAC men's basketball tournament
Basketball competitions in the Las Vegas Valley
College basketball tournaments in Nevada
College sports tournaments in Nevada